Victor Mehdy Lekhal (Arabic: فيكتور مهدي لكحل; born 27 February 1994) is an Algerian footballer who plays as a midfielder for Le Havre.

International
Born in France, Lekhal's family is originally from Sétif, Algeria. He made his debut for the Algeria national football team on 26 March 2019 in a friendly against Tunisia, as a starter.

References

External links

1994 births
Living people
Algerian footballers
Algeria international footballers
People from Fécamp
Association football midfielders
French footballers
French sportspeople of Algerian descent
Ligue 2 players
Le Havre AC players
US Avranches players
Sportspeople from Seine-Maritime
Footballers from Normandy